Moechotypa marmorea is a species of beetle in the family Cerambycidae. It was described by Pascoe in 1864. They are known to be found on Borneo.

References

marmorea
Beetles described in 1864